The 2018–19 season are the Padideh Football Club's 5th season in the Iran Pro League and the top division of Iranian football. They are also competing in the Hazfi Cup.

Squad

First-team squad
Updated as April 9, 2019

For recent transfers, see List of Iranian football transfers winter 2018–19.

Transfers

Summer 

In:

Out:

Winter

Coaching staff

Competitions

Overview

Persian Gulf Pro League

Standings

Results summary

Results by round

Matches

Hazfi Cup

See also
 2018–19 Iran Pro League
 2018–19 Hazfi Cup

References

External links
Iran Premier League Statistics
Persian League

Iranian football club seasons